Ferdinand Hart (28 October 1893 in Písek – 12 January 1937 in Prague) was a film actor from Czechoslovakia.

Selected filmography
 The Hungarian Princess (1923)
 The Queen of the Baths (1926)
 You Walk So Softly (1928)
 Under Suspicion (1928)
 The Green Monocle (1929)
 His Majesty's Lieutenant (1929)
 Dreyfus (1930)
The Citadel of Warsaw (1930)
 The Last Company (1930)
 The Stolen Face (1930)
 Wibbel the Tailor (1931)
 Danton (1931)
 Bobby Gets Going (1931)
 Panik in Chicago (1931)
 In the Employ of the Secret Service (1931)
 The Adventurer of Tunis (1931)
 Louise, Queen of Prussia (1931)
 1914 (1931)
 That's All That Matters (1931)
 A Mad Idea (1932)
 Haunted People (1932)
 The Beautiful Adventure (1932)
 The Eleven Schill Officers (1932)
 Secret Agent (1932)
 The Flower of Hawaii (1933)
 The Happiness of Grinzing (1933)
 In the Little House Below Emauzy (1933)
 Life Is a Dog (1933)
 Long Live with Dearly Departed (1935)
 Le Golem (1936)

External links

1893 births
1937 deaths
People from Písek
People from the Kingdom of Bohemia
Czechoslovak male film actors
Czechoslovak male silent film actors